"Beautiful" is a song by Canadian singer-songwriter Gordon Lightfoot. This song first appeared on Lightfoot's 1972 LP Don Quixote, the first of two singles to be released. The album's title track appeared on the B-side.

Reception 
It reached number 13 in Canada and peaked at number 58 on the U.S. Billboard Hot 100 singles chart in June 1972. The song also hit number one on the Canadian Adult Contemporary chart, his second of seven to do so, and number 30 on the U.S. Easy Listening chart.

Chart performance

References

External links 
 

Gordon Lightfoot songs
1972 songs
1972 singles
Songs written by Gordon Lightfoot
Reprise Records singles
Song recordings produced by Lenny Waronker
Canadian soft rock songs
1970s ballads